Emmett Woodrow Morrison (August 24, 1915 – February 2, 1993) was an American professional basketball player. He played in the National Basketball League for the Warren Penns during the 1937–38 season and averaged 1.7 points per game. He left the University of Pittsburgh after his sophomore season to focus on his professional basketball career.

References

1915 births
1993 deaths
American men's basketball players
Basketball players from Pennsylvania
Forwards (basketball)
Guards (basketball)
People from Indiana County, Pennsylvania
Pittsburgh Panthers men's basketball players
Warren Penns players